The Ultimate Tour was the sixth concert tour by British group Steps. Formed in 1997, the group comprises Claire Richards, Faye Tozer, Ian "H" Watkins, Lee Latchford-Evans and Lisa Scott-Lee.
Beginning in April 2012, 'The Ultimate Tour' supports the band's compilation album, The Ultimate Collection. It is the group's first concert tour in 11 years. Additional dates were added for the summer of 2012, playing music festivals. The tour predominantly visited arenas across the United Kingdom as well as a one-off performance in the Republic of Ireland. The initial UK dates sold out in the first few hours of their general release, leading the band to announce six new dates. Dates were also added for music festivals for summer 2012.

Background

Sony record company intended to release a greatest hits album with the Steps music due to the ten-year anniversary following their 'acrimonious' split in 2001. Claire Richards said with the production of The Ultimate Collection album coupled with the ten-year anniversary, 'it just seemed right' to get back together. As the group reconciled, plans for a reunion tour developed. The tour was announced by Steps in their Sky Living documentary "Steps: Reunion". The tour was confirmed on the band appearance on This Morning. The band performed hits "Tragedy" and "It's the Way You Make Me Feel".

Concert synopsis
The pre-show begins with a video shown on a large screen dominating the backdrop of the step, showing a one-minute countdown as the dancers come onstage. As the dancers arrive onstage, images of vaults and tubes with Steps inside are shown on the screens. The concept behind this is that the five members of Steps have been cryogenically frozen since their 2001 split at the final Manchester date.

The five band members rise onto the stage in five separate glass tubes, symbolising the idea that they are being awoken ten years after the split. The set list begins with "Here and Now" by performing from inside the tubes throughout the song. The song goes straight into "You'll Be Sorry". Afterwards, each member in turn is spotlighted as they introduce themselves to the crowd as their names appear on the screen. This is followed by "Deeper Shade of Blue" which also contains a dance break which samples Britney Spears' Hold It Against Me.

The group then exits the stage as a musical interlude and dance number by the dancers is played. Steps returns to the stage on a lift that sees them above the stage in height. Saying that they are back, they each split the crowd into different teams. Each member has their own team, and their own new dance move they show. Using these dance moves and the original choreography, they perform a medley of "Last Thing on My Mind", "Better Best Forgotten" and "Love's Got a Hold on My Heart", followed by "5,6,7,8" which is followed by a video montage of fans performing 5,6,7,8.

The next section begins with a salsa dance routine performed by the dancers. This section consists of "Summer of Love" Tour Mix, which was originally intended for the Steptacular Tour and "Better the Devil You Know", mixed with Lady Gaga's "Judas".

As with all of their other tours in the past, they each perform solo songs. Lee, performs a mashup of Maroon 5's hit "Moves Like Jagger" with Rihanna's "S&M". Faye performs "One Night Only". H performs a cover of Journey's "Don't Stop Believin'". Lisa sings a medley of "Heaven", "Beautiful People" and her debut hit single "Lately". Finally, Claire, performs a cover of Celine Dion's "I Surrender".

The next section begins with an operatic-style video interlude. "It's the Way You Make Me Feel" is next followed by "Heartbeat". "When I Said Goodbye" is then performed, followed by "One For Sorrow".

After the band goes offstage, during which a musical interlude is played, they return onstage with "Stomp" and "Chain Reaction". The show ends with their cover ABBA's "Dancing Queen", a song which was recorded especially for their Ultimate Collection album. After a brief pause, a remix interlude is heard before Steps return to the stage for the final time to perform the encore consisting of "Tragedy".

The tour uses innovative technology such as super high-resolution video screen. The screen is used reached to by the band, including H's solo section in which he performs synchronising movements against images onscreen, and a section performed by the whole band which references rhythm games such as Just Dance.

Support acts
Kamaliya
Shockolady
Alexandra Burke (Swansea)

Setlist

Futuristic Intro 
"Here and Now"
"You'll Be Sorry"
"Deeper Shade of Blue" (Sleazesisters Anthem Mix – Intro) – Contains elements of Hold It Against Me
Medley: "Last Thing on My Mind"/"Better Best Forgotten"/"Love's Got a Hold on My Heart"
"5,6,7,8"

Salsa 
Costume Change
 "Summer of Love"
"Better the Devil You Know"/"Judas"

Solos
 Lee solo: "Moves Like Jagger" / "S&M"
Faye solo: "One Night Only"
'H' solo: "Don't Stop Believin'"
Lisa solo: "Heaven" / "Beautiful People" / "Lately"
Claire solo: "I Surrender"

Ballads 
Costume Change
"It's the Way You Make Me Feel" (Features an opera-styled intro)
"Heartbeat"
"When I Said Goodbye"
"One For Sorrow"

Disco 
Costume Change
"Stomp"
"Chain Reaction"
"Dancing Queen"

Encore
Costume Change
 "Tragedy"  
 "Goodbyes"/"Thank Yous"

Tour dates

Festivals and other miscellaneous performances
This concert was a part of "Live at the Marquee"
This concert was a part of "Forestry Commission Live Music"
This concert was a part of "Gŵyl Gobaith Music Festival"

Cancellations and rescheduled shows

Box office score data

Broadcasts and Recordings

During the autumn of 2011, Sky Living broadcast 'Steps Reunion', which documented the group's initial reconciliation. The show proved to be extremely successful, as it gained 1.3 million viewers each week throughout the series. Following the success of 'Steps Reunion', Sky Living broadcast 'Steps: On The Road Again', which started on Monday 23 April and ends on Monday 28 May. The show documents the band throughout the creation and development of the Ultimate Tour, including dance rehearsals, costume fittings, promotion interviews and the pre-tour performance at London's G-A-Y nightclub.

The concerts performed at Liverpool Echo Arena, Manchester Arena, The first Birmingham's LG Arena Show, Cardiff Motorpoint Arena and London O2 Arena, were all recorded for a Live CD release teamed up with Concert Live. The 3-disc set comes with choreographed videos, exclusive interviews and rehearsal footage, as well as never-before-seen photographs of the band. A new edition of the 'Ultimate Collection' was released on 30 April 2012, entitled 'Ultimate Collection: Tour Edition'. On Monday 28 May, Sky Living It are showing a 1-hour programme showing footage from Step's sold out concerts at The O2 Arena in London before the release of The Ultimate tour Live DVD on 29 October 2012. It charted at number one on the Official Charts Company's Music Video Chart on 4 November 2012

Reception

The tour proved to be extremely popular amongst fans as the initial UK dates sold out in the first few hours of their general release. 100,000 tickets are claimed to have been sold when the tour officially went on sale, making it one of the most popular tours of the year.

The tour received fairly positive reviews, with positive critiques of their general energy and interaction with the crowd and praise over Claire's rendition of Celine Dion's 'I Surrender'. The overall reception by fans was extremely positive.

External links
 
 Ultimate Steps

References

Steps (group) concert tours
2012 concert tours